Peixoto de Azevedo is a municipality in the Brazilian state of Mato Grosso. Peixoto de Azevedo was the ancient location of the Panará indigenous people. They were expelled during the 19th century gold rush in the region. From the 20th century, the Panará people were relocated to the Kapoto-Jarinã indigenous territory created by the Villas-Bôas brothers.

The nearby Alta Floresta Gold Province comprises 38 gold mines.

On September 29, 2006, Gol Transportes Aéreos Flight 1907 crashed approximately 200 kilometers (120 mi) east of the city center.

The geographic center of Brazil is located within the municipality.

References

Municipalities in Mato Grosso